The Basilica of St. Michael the Archangel is located on a hill overlooking the Miramichi River in the province of New Brunswick, Canada. It is the dominant feature of the former town of Chatham, New Brunswick, and one of the largest churches in Eastern Canada. It is now included within the city of Miramichi which was formed in 1995.

Design

St. Michael's Basilica is among the largest churches in Canada, east of Quebec City. The sandstone neo-Gothic structure was designed by the same architect, Patrick Keely, as Holy Name Cathedral in Chicago, and the Sts. Peter and Paul Cathedral in Providence, Rhode Island. St. Michael's Basilica is  taller than Holy Name in Chicago, somewhat narrower, and about the same length, Holy Name seats about 300 more people (1,520 vs 1,200). Construction of the cathedral started in 1903 and finished in 1921. Italian marble with veined panels was used throughout the interior of the nave and the sacristy. The spire is visible for several miles, especially when approaching Chatham from the north, across the Centennial Bridge that spans the Miramichi River.

Congregation

St. Michael's Basilica is a testament to the faith of the Irish Catholics, who immigrated to New Brunswick before the Great Famine. As late as the 1980s, large numbers of worshipers attended daily mass during Lent. The church was one way that the new Catholic immigrants of all ethnic origins maintained their unique identity.

When the Irish Catholics came to Canada, unlike their counterparts in the United States, they were barred from public office and the professions. They were required in the early days to tithe to the Church of England. These barriers were lifted during the 19th century, but Irish Catholics remained marginalized and banded together to protect their interests, with St. Michael's helping to bring them all together. The parish served by St. Michael's had a long history of providing priests for the area and sending others to the foreign missions or to Western Canada. By 1975, however, vocations to the priesthood from Chatham and the area had essentially dried up.

Features

With an austere beauty and pleasing lines, the basilica was built as the cathedral of a once-extensive Diocese of Chatham, that covered the northern part of the province.

Notable features of the cathedral are the Lady chapel to the west of the main church, a tall single spire (once illuminated by the Canadian Air Force because of the proximity of a fighter base), a green copper roof, and a matching Bishop's Palace to the southeast. Its great bells, whether tolling a funeral, sounding the Angelus or joyously ringing in Easter or Christmas, have long been a feature of life in the town. A fine stand of linden trees, planted by Bishop James Rogers, stands to the east of the basilica, in front of the palace.

Designation
The church is unique in that it was the cathedral of the Diocese of Chatham, but lost that distinction when the see moved in 1938. The church was then designated a pro-cathedral until 1989, when Pope John Paul II elevated it to a minor basilica.

Pastors

List of parish priests since the construction of the basilica:

See also
 Saint Michael: Roman Catholic traditions and views

References

External links

 

Michael
Roman Catholic churches in New Brunswick
Buildings and structures in Miramichi, New Brunswick
Tourist attractions in Northumberland County, New Brunswick